Deer Leap Falls is the third waterfall located in the George W. Childs Recreation Site, Pike County, Pennsylvania, United States.  It is located downstream from the Factory Falls and Fulmer Falls on the Dingmans Creek.

It is a popular site for hikers and tourists who want to avoid the more crowded Dingmans Falls, a short hike downstream, or the commercial Bushkill Falls, a very popular tourist attraction in the Pocono Mountains area.

References

National Park Service official website

Pocono Mountains
Waterfalls of Pike County, Pennsylvania
Delaware Water Gap National Recreation Area